Clelio Darida (3 May 1927 – 11 May 2017) was an Italian politician. He was mayor of Rome and minister of the Italian Republic.

Biography
Darida was born in Rome in 1927. 

Starting from June 1960, he was member of Rome's municipal council for his party, Christian Democracy (DC). Within the DC, he was a member of the faction of Amintore Fanfani first, and Arnaldo Forlani later. He was elected mayor of Rome on 30 July 1969, being confirmed on 17 March 1972. In 1974 he formed a city council including only DC member, with indirect support by the councillors of the Italian Communist Party.

In 1976 he resigned as mayor to participate in the 1976 general elections. He was elected in the Chamber of Deputies, being confirmed until 1992, when he was not re-elected. 

Darida served as Undersecretary at the Ministry of the Interior from 1976 to 1980, and, from 1980 to 1987, he served as Minister for the Parliamentary Relations, as Minister of Post and Telecommunications, as Minister of Public Function, as Minister of Justice and as Minister of State Holdings.

During the Tangentopoli corruption scandal in the early 1990s, he was accused of bribery and imprisoned for a short period in San Vittore Prison. Later he was acquitted of all accusations and obtained from the Ministry of the Treasury a compensation of ₤100 million.

In 2006 Darida participated with Publio Fiori in the constitution of a new political movement of Christian inspiration, the Christian Democratic Refoundation, of which he was appointed President of the National Council.

In 2012 Darida accepted the invitation of several former Christian Democrat national councilors in office in 1993 and convened the National Council of Christian Democracy, after the Court of Cassation acknowledged that this party had never been dissolved, since the National Council that sanctioned the birth of the Italian People's Party in 1994 also didn't have the power to deliberate dissolution of the DC. On 30 March 2012 Darida proceeded, together with 48 other members, the self-convocation of the DC National Council, electing the new National Directorate. Gianni Fontana was appointed secretary of the reborn Christian Democracy, Silvio Lega was appointed president of the National Council, while Clelio Darida was appointed honorary president of the party.

A few months after having contributed personally to the reconvening of the 1993 DC National Council, Darida abandoned the Christian Democracy led by Fontana to join the Christian Democracy led by Angelo Sandri, of which he became honorary president.

Darida died in Rome on 11 May 2017.

References

External links
 

1927 births
2017 deaths
Politicians from Rome
Christian Democracy (Italy) politicians
20th-century Italian politicians
Government ministers of Italy
Mayors of Rome
Italian Ministers of Justice